Philip Trevor Kerslake  (born 24 May 1959) is a Welsh-born New Zealand speaker, author and television presenter who has appeared on the weekday morning series, Good Morning and in other New Zealand media. He is also a cancer survivor.

Biography
Kerslake experienced symptoms of a lymphoma at age 14 or 15, and when he was 19 in 1979, he was given a terminal prognosis. He wrote of his experiences in the 2006 book Life, Happiness... and Cancer: Survive with action and attitude!. The book continues (at 2020) to sell in bulk to cancer support NGO's and others who distribute the work to new patients to help them potentially achieve better outcomes from their treatments. The book was published in Australia in 2008 and in Africa and Poland in 2010, each through different publishers. It was later published in paperback in Australia by Fontaine Press, and as an e-book through Amazon.com in 2013.

Kerslake gives talks to cancer patients, cancer support professionals and medical professionals mainly throughout New Zealand, on the use of psychosocial (mind-body-spirit) support measures to help patients cope with their experiences. He is also a professional motivational speaker, using his life story to inspire people to live their lives with the kind of tenacity and resilience he has managed to develop to survive numerous cancer diagnoses over more than 40 years.People may use these traits to be more resilient and adaptive in all areas of their lives.

Kerslake has been recognised widely for his work in cancer patient support. In Vienna, Austria in June 2007, he won an international "Re-Building Lives Award". In 2011 the American Cancer Society appointed Kerslake a "Global Hero of Hope" in Florida, USA. In the 2014 New Year Honours, Kerslake was appointed a Member of the New Zealand Order of Merit, for services to people with cancer.

In 2019 Kerslake received several honours. His Alumni Karate Club, Chidokan Karate-Do International, awarded Kerslake the rank of Shodan, 1st Degree Black Belt, on 1 February 2019. Having had to retire from training at purple belt in 1979 due to his cancer and treatments, the organisation took account of his more than 40 years fighting cancer since. Kancho Sims Sensei, 9th Degree Black Belt CKI - KNZ wrote Kerslake:"1st Degree Black Belt is awarded to Chidokan students who have displayed great perseverance and have achieved karate-do excellence ... your struggle (fighting cancer) over the forty years since is indeed a true indication of courage, perseverance and victory - perfection of character at its finest. Congratulations."

On 1 August 2019 Kerslake was awarded Life Membership of the Cancer Society of New Zealand, Wellington Division Inc. 'for distinguished services to the Cancer Society.' A wide variety of services and collaborations were delivered over three decades from 1989.

On 1 November 2019 Kerslake was bestowed with the honorary title Te Rangatira Toa Oranga - 'The Chief Wellbeing Warrior,' by The Aratika Cancer Trust (Rotorua). The title was said to be bestowed "for the many years of combating relentless cancer diagnoses and treatments with fierce determination and resilience, just as a fighting warrior should. "We want to thank you for giving hope to many others who have followed your advice about surviving a terminal cancer diagnosis." A tokotoko fitting of this office was also carved and presented to Kerslake. Commissioned by the Trust and "other friends" on Phil's cancer journey (i.e. NGO Leaders including the Chair of the Breast Cancer Aotearoa Coalition). The tokotoko was created by renowned Maori artist and carver Lewis Tamihana Gardiner (Te Arawa/Ngati Awa/Te Whanau-a-Apanui/Ngai Tahu). The tokotoko blessing and presentation was carried out at Te Puna a Tuhoe, Fairy Springs, Rotorua by Te Arawa-Ngati Pikiao Rangatira, Wetini Mitai-Ngatai. ONZM, and Aratika Cancer Trustees, on 8 November 2019.

Kerslake divides his time between managing his periodic active treatments, volunteer work in cancer patient support, and paid employment through his motivational talks . He lives in Wellington, New Zealand with his wife Gillian and their two sons Rhys and Matthew.

See also
 List of New Zealand television personalities

References

External links
 Life Paths Ltd

1959 births
Living people
New Zealand television presenters
People from Swansea
Welsh emigrants to New Zealand
Members of the New Zealand Order of Merit